Naef, Naeff or Näf is a Swiss surname that may refer to 
Adolf Naef (1883–1949), Swiss zoologist and palaeontologist
Adrian Naef (born 1948), Swiss writer and musician
Ernest Näf (born 1920), Swiss racing cyclist
Fritz Naef (1934–2014), Swiss ice hockey player 
Ralph Näf (born 1980), Swiss cross-country mountain biker
Robert Adolf Naef (1907–1975), Swiss banker and astronomer
1906 Naef, a stony asteroid named after Robert Naef
Observatory Naef Épendes, an astronomical observatory at Épendes, Switzerland, named after Robert Naef
Roslï Näf (1911–1996), Swiss Red Cross nurse
Wilhelm Matthias Naeff (1802–1881), Swiss politician
Surnames of Swiss origin

German-language surnames